Josh or Joshua Ralph may refer to:

J. Ralph, American composer
Josh Ralph (athlete), Australian athlete
Josh Ralph (rugby league)